Vasily Mikhailovich Andrianov (21 March 1902, Kaluga Province —  3 October 1978, Moscow) was a Soviet politician.

He served in the Red Army from 1924 until 1925.

In 1926 he joined the Bolshevik Party.

He eventually rose to be the leader of the Communist Party in the city of Sverdlovsk from 1939 until 1946.

He eventually rose to be the leader of the Communist Party in the city of Leningrad from 1949 until 1953.

He was a member of the Presidium of the CPSU Central Committee from 1952 until 1953. 

He was buried at the Novodevichi Cemetery, Moscow.

References 

1902 births
1978 deaths
People from Kirovsky District, Kaluga Oblast
People from Kaluga Governorate
Politburo of the Central Committee of the Communist Party of the Soviet Union members
First convocation members of the Soviet of the Union
Second convocation members of the Soviet of the Union
Third convocation members of the Soviet of the Union
Members of the Supreme Soviet of the Russian Soviet Federative Socialist Republic, 1938–1947
Members of the Supreme Soviet of the Russian Soviet Federative Socialist Republic, 1951–1955
Recipients of the Order of Lenin